Untamed Youth is a 1924 American silent drama film directed by Emile Chautard and starring Derelys Perdue, Lloyd Hughes and Ralph Lewis.

Plot summary

Cast
 Ralph Lewis as Joe Ardis
 Derelys Perdue as Marcheta
 Lloyd Hughes as Robert Ardis
 Emily Fitzroy as Emily Ardis
 Josef Swickard as Pietro
 Joseph J. Dowling as Reverend Loranger
 Tom O'Brien as Jim Larson
 Mickey McBan as Ralph

References

Bibliography
 Munden, Kenneth White. The American Film Institute Catalog of Motion Pictures Produced in the United States, Part 1. University of California Press, 1997.

External links
 
 
 
 

1924 films
1924 drama films
1920s English-language films
American silent feature films
Silent American drama films
American black-and-white films
Films directed by Emile Chautard
Film Booking Offices of America films
1920s American films
English-language drama films